Antonio Paul Palladino (born 29 June 1983), known as Tony Palladino, is an English professional cricketer. He is a right-handed batsman and a right-arm medium-pace bowler. 

He played for Essex and Derbyshire County Cricket Club  between 2003 and 2020. 

A popular player with colleagues and the cricket community, he was not re-engaged by Derbyshire following the end of the 2020 season when the Covid pandemic hit the world of sport quite severely . Palladino subsequently sued Derbyshire,  claiming wrongful dismissal & discrimination on the grounds of mental health - the case has now concluded. He had been the county's leading wicket taker over the 2018 / 2019 seasons and had been the mainstay of the county bowling attack for a number of years. 

Since leaving Derbyshire, he has been Professional / 1st Team Coach (Level 3 Coach) at South Wingfield Cricket Club where promotion to the Derbyshire County Division One has been achieved one year after his arrival (52 wickets @12.4 www.play-cricket.com) & coaches junior cricket @ Brailsford & Ednaston Cricket Club in Derbyshire

References

External links

1983 births
English cricketers
Living people
Alumni of Anglia Ruskin University
Essex cricketers
English people of Italian descent
Italian British sportspeople
Essex Cricket Board cricketers
Namibia cricketers
Derbyshire cricketers
Suffolk cricketers
British Universities cricketers
Cambridge MCCU cricketers